Chariali is an Indian name and it may refer to 

 Baihata Chariali, Town in Assam
 Biswanath Chariali, City in Assam
 Bishwanath Chariali, district in Assam
 Maligaon Chariali, location in Guwahati, Assam